THO complex subunit 2 is a protein that in humans is encoded by the THOC2 gene.

THO2 is part of the TREX (transcription/export) complex, which includes TEX1 (MIM 606929), HPR1 (MIM 606930), ALY (MIM 604171), and UAP56 (MIM 606390).[supplied by OMIM]

References

Further reading